Agency for Technical Cooperation and Development, commonly known as ACTED, is a French humanitarian non-governmental organisation. It is a non-governmental, non-political and non-profit organisation. ACTED works in 37 countries responding to emergencies and crisis situations.

ACTED was initially established in Kabul, Afghanistan in 1993, distributing coal and flour to bakeries to cope with bread shortages. Activities quickly expanded around the country and then to wider Central Asia. From here, ACTED's work spread to Africa, Central America, the Middle East and Southeast Asia. ACTED has its head office in Paris and network offices in Geneva, London, Ottawa and Washington, D.C.

The NGO implements programmes in 37 countries in Central Asia, South Asia, and Southeast Asia; South America and the Caribbean; the Middle East and North Africa; West, Central and East Africa; and Europe.

In 2019, ACTED implemented more than 400 projects reaching directly 20.7 million people, with a €315 million budget and more than 6,200 staff.

ACTED is also one of the seven member NGOs of Alliance2015, along with Ayuda en Acción, Cesvi, Concern Worldwide, Helvetas Swiss Intercooperation, Hivos, People in Need and Welthungerhilfe.

History 
ACTED was founded in Afghanistan in 1993.  By 1996, the organisation expanded to neighboring countries.

ACTED is a signatory of the Code of Conduct for the International Red Cross and Red Crescent Movement and Non-Governmental Organisations in Disaster Relief.

Countries of intervention 
As of October 2020, ACTED is present in Afghanistan, Bangladesh, Burkina Faso, Central African Republic, Chad, Colombia, Congo (Rep.), Dem. Rep. Congo, Ethiopia, Haiti, Iraq, Ivory Coast, Jordan, Kenya, Kyrgyzstan, Lebanon, Libya, Mali, Myanmar, Mozambique, Niger, Nigeria, occupied Palestinian Territory, Pakistan, Philippines, Senegal, Somalia, South Sudan, Sri Lanka,Sudan, Syria, Tajikistan, Thailand, Tunisia, Turkey, Uganda, Ukraine, Uzbekistan, and Yemen.

References

External links
 Official website 

Non-profit organizations based in France
Emergency organizations
Economic development organizations